The Little Ann River is an  tributary of the Ann River of Minnesota, United States.

See also
List of rivers of Minnesota

References

Minnesota Watersheds
USGS Hydrologic Unit Map - State of Minnesota (1974)

Rivers of Minnesota